Elham Farahmand Souderjani (born 12 September 1993), known as Elham Farahmand, is an Iranian footballer who plays as a midfielder for Kowsar Women Football League club Vachan Kurdistan and the Iran women's national team.

References 

1993 births
Living people
Iranian women's footballers
Iran women's international footballers
Women's association football midfielders
People from Isfahan Province
21st-century Iranian women